Chloro(pyridine)cobaloxime is a coordination compound containing a CoIII center with octahedral coordination. It has been considered as a model compound of vitamin B12 for studying the properties and mechanism of action of the vitamin. It belongs to a class of bis(dimethylglyoximato)cobalt(III) complexes with different axial ligands, called cobaloximes.  Chloro(pyridine)cobaloxime is a yellow-brown powder that is sparingly soluble in most solvents, including water.

Structure
The complex adopts a distorted octahedral geometry.  Cobalt(III) is bound to two dimethylglyoximate ligands, i.e., mono-deprotonated dimethylglyoxime, in the equatorial plane.  Completing the coordination sphere are chloride and a pyridine at the axial positions.

Reactions
The cobaloxime is slowly decomposed by acids and bases. With acids, the products of decomposition are dimethylglyoxime, cobalt salts, and pyridine; with bases, derivatives of other cobaloximes are formed, usually with the release of chloride ions.

The complex has no reaction with hydrogen gas, and cannot carry oxygen as salcomine does. It would, however, react with hydrogen in the presence of sodium hydroxide, a catalytic amount of platinum metal, or a reduced cobaloxime, therefore once the reduction occurs, the hydrogenation would occur much more rapidly as there is autocatalysis.

The reduction products of cobaloxime depends on the conditions. At pH near 7, a cobaloxime with a CoII center is formed. With a higher pH, the cobalt center would be further reduced to the CoI state, which is supernucleophilic.

Preparation
The compound is usually prepared by mixing cobalt(II) chloride, dimethylglyoxime and pyridine in an ethanolic solution.  This process afford the cobaloxime(II), which is subsequently oxidized by the oxygen in air:

 4 CoCl2•6H2O + 8 dmgH2 + 8 py + O2 → 4 ClCo(dmgH)2py + 4 py•HCl + 14 H2O
Using cobalt(II) acetate in place of cobalt(II) chloride produce aceto(pyridine)cobaloxime. This acetate can be converted to the respective bromide, iodide, cyanate, cyanide, azide and thiocyanate.
 (CH3COO)Co(DH)2py + NaX → XCo(DH)2py + NaCH3COO (X = Br, I, CNO, CN, N3 or SCN)

Reactions
The pyridine base in the axial position can also be replaced by other organic bases containing a sp2 hybridized N atom as well. Commonly used bases are morpholine, 4-methylpyridine, imidazole and benzimidazole. The derivatives are again prepared via diacetocobaloxime, followed by the addition of the desired base, such as imidazole.
 (CH3COO)2Co(DH)2 + imi → (CH3COO)Co(DH)2imi

Alkylation of Co
One of the methods used for producing the Co-C bond is to make use of the supernucleophilicity of the CoI center. Chloro(pyridine)cobaloxime(III) is first reduced to Chloro(pyridine)cobaloxime(I) by sodium borohydride in alkaline solution, then an alkyl halide is added into the reaction mixture, and the desired Co-C bond is formed via a SN2 reaction. This method can be used to produce cobaloximes containing a primary or a secondary alkyl substituent.

For derivatives with phenyl or vinyl substituent, the Grignard reaction is employed. However, since the dimethylglyoxime ligands contains two acidic H atoms in the oxime group, the Grignard reagent must be used in three-fold excess to compensate the loss.

References

Coordination complexes
Cobalt complexes
Cobalt(III) compounds
Ketoximes
Pyridine complexes